Taronites, feminine form Taronitissa (Ταρωνίτισσα), was the name of a noble Byzantine family, descended from the ruling family of the Armenian principality of Taron. In Georgian it is rendered 'Tornikes' or ‘Tornikios’. 

It was founded by the brothers Gregory and Bagrat (Pankratios in Greek), who ceded the principality to the Byzantines in 968 in exchange for estates and high dignities. The wife of Theodosios Monomachos, and mother of his son, Constantine IX, was a (Irene?) Tornikaina/Taronitissa.

The family is prominent among the military aristocracy in the late 10th/early 11th centuries, and later became related to the Komnenian dynasty through the marriage of Michael Taronites to Maria, the sister of Alexios I Komnenos. In the 12th century, the Taronitai became mainly civilian bureaucrats, many occupying high posts in the central government in Constantinople. The family lost its status and influence after the dissolution of the Byzantine Empire by the Fourth Crusade in 1204.

References

Sources